John Douglas "Doug" Woodward (14 March 1925 – 16 May 1995), also known as Douglas Woodward, was a Canadian sailor who competed in the 1952 Summer Olympics and in the 1964 Summer Olympics.

See also
 John Douglas Woodward, the 19th-century artist

References

1925 births
1995 deaths
Canadian male sailors (sport)
Olympic sailors of Canada
Sailors at the 1952 Summer Olympics – Star
Sailors at the 1964 Summer Olympics – 5.5 Metre
Place of birth missing